Carabus gigolo is a species of ground beetle from family Carabidae. The species are black coloured.

References

gigolo
Beetles described in 1996